The NOAA Administrator's Award is an award of the National Oceanic and Atmospheric Administration (NOAA). The award is granted by the Under Secretary of Commerce for Oceans and Atmosphere who serves concurrently as the Administrator of the National Oceanic and Atmospheric Administration. The award, which may go to an individual or a group, is presented in recognition of significant contributions to NOAA programs. The award is presented to civilian employees of NOAA as a plaque and as a medal set to members of the NOAA Commissioned Officer Corps. Individual recipients of the award receive a monetary award of $5,000. Recipients of group awards split the monetary award evenly. Administrator's Award recipients are formally recognized at an award ceremony held annually.

Award criteria
The NOAA Administrator's Award is granted to recognize recognition of significant contributions to NOAA programs. Eligible contributions must be in the areas of  Equal Employment Opportunity, program management, scientific research, public service, engineering development, environmental conservation, policy development, administrative support, public affairs, and information systems. Nominations for the Administrator's Award are reviewed by the NOAA Incentive Awards Board (NIAB). During the board's review of the nomination the following factors are considered:
 The importance of the cited contribution, as well as the urgency of its need, to NOAA programs
 How unique and original is the cited contribution
 Did the cited contribution bring unusual credit to NOAA and Department of Commerce (DOC)
 Did the contribution result in an unusually important and clearly demonstrated improvement in a NOAA program 
 In the case of nominated supervisors, did the cited contribution demonstrate significant leadership skills
 Did exceptional leadership, skill, ingenuity, or ability displayed in administration or performance of duties accomplish significant savings in money, time, staff resources, or equipment
 Creation or development of a major improvement in a service which results in a high degree of benefit to NOAA or DOC 
 Successful implementation of new or improved policies in NOAA
 Exceptional skill and ingenuity in focusing on policy needs 
 Contributions in engineering development in the areas of applied technology systems or equipment developed
 Important scientific research contributions
 Excellence in program and/or project planning which includes developing a clear concept based on mission requirements, developing a plan, including cost, schedule, and performance milestones, and the completion of predetermined milestones

Medal appearance
The NOAA Administrator's Award Medal is made of red brass with a matte finish. It hangs from a ring suspension. Subsequent awards are denoted by 5/16 inch gold award stars.

Notable recipients
Harold E. Brooks
Evan Forde
Christopher Landsea
Anita L. Lopez
Michael S. Devany

References

Awards and decorations of the National Oceanic and Atmospheric Administration